Bumetopia bakeri is a species of beetle in the family Cerambycidae. It was described by Per Olof Christopher Aurivillius in 1927 and is known from the Philippines.

References

Homonoeini
Beetles described in 1927